Roads in Pakistan are generally classified as federal, provincial and municipal roads.

Federal roads
Federal roads are controlled by the Government of Pakistan and maintained by the National Highway Authority. They are divided into three classes.

National Highways

Motorways

Expressways

Provincial and territorial roads
Provincial and territorial roads are controlled by the respective provincial and territorial governments of Pakistan and maintained by each province's Highway Authority.

Islamabad Capital Territory

Khyber Pakhtunkhwa

Provincial Highways of Khyber Pakthunkhwa consists of all public highways maintained by Khyber Pakthunkhwa. All provincial highways in Khyber Pakhtunkhwa are pre-fixed with the letter 'S' followed by the unique numerical designation of the specific highway (with a hyphen in the middle), i.e. S-1, S-2, S-3, etc.

Gilgit-Baltistan

Provincial Highways of Gilgit-Baltistan consists of all public highways maintained by Gilgit-Baltistan.

Punjab

Provincial Highways of Punjab consists of all public highways maintained by Punjab.

Sindh

Provincial Highways of Sindh consists of all public highways maintained by Sindh.

Municipal roads
Municipal roads are controlled by the respective district governments or city governments.

Azad Jammu & Kashmir
 Roads in Kotli
 Roads in Muzaffarabad
 Roads in Mirpur

Balochistan
 Roads in Gwadar
 Roads in Quetta
 Roads in Turbat

Gilgit-Baltistan
 Roads in Gilgit
 Roads in Skardu

Khyber Pakhtunkhwa
 Roads in Abbottabad
 Roads in Mardan
 Roads in Peshawar

Punjab
 Roads in Faisalabad
 Roads in Lahore
 Roads in Multan
 Roads in Rawalpindi

Sindh
 Roads in Hyderabad
 Roads in Karachi
 Roads in Sukkur

See also 

 Transport in Pakistan
 National Highways of Pakistan

References